Opostega is a genus of moths of the family Opostegidae with 49 listed species.

Species

Opostega afghani D.R. Davis, 1989
Opostega amphimitra Meyrick, 1913
Opostega angulata Gerasimov, 1930
Opostega argentella Bradley, 1957
Opostega arthrota Meyrick, 1915
Opostega atypa Turner, 1923
Opostega basilissa Meyrick, 1893
Opostega bimaculatella Rothschild, 1912
Opostega brithys Turner, 1923
Opostega chalcophylla Meyrick, 1910
Opostega chalcoplethes Turner, 1923
Opostega chalinias Meyrick, 1893
Opostega chordacta Meyrick, 1915
Opostega cirrhacma Meyrick, 1911
Opostega costantiniella Costantini, 1923
Opostega cretatella Chrétien, 1915
Opostega diorthota Meyrick, 1893
Opostega diplardis Meyrick, 1912
Opostega granifera Meyrick, 1913
Opostega heringella Mariani, 1937
Opostega horaria Meyrick, 1921
Opostega idiocoma Meyrick, 1918
Opostega ischnophaea Meyrick, 1930
Opostega kuznetzovi Kozlov, 1985
Opostega luticilia Meyrick, 1915
Opostega melitardis Meyrick, 1918
Opostega monotypa Turner, 1923
Opostega nubifera Turner, 1900
Opostega orestias Meyrick, 1880
Opostega orophoxantha Meyrick, 1921
Opostega pelocrossa Meyrick, 1928
Opostega phaeosoma Meyrick, 1928
Opostega phaeospila Turner, 1923
Opostega praefusca Meyrick, 1913
Opostega radiosa Meyrick, 1913
Opostega rezniki Kozlov, 1985
Opostega salaciella (Treitschke, 1833)
Opostega scoliozona Meyrick, 1915
Opostega snelleni Nolcken, 1882
Opostega spatulella Herrich-Schäffer, 1855
Opostega stekolnikovi Kozlov, 1985
Opostega stiriella Meyrick, 1881
Opostega symbolica Meyrick, 1914
Opostega tincta Meyrick, 1918
Opostega xenodoxa Meyrick, 1893

External links

 Generic Revision of the Opostegidae, with a Synoptic Catalog of the World's Species (Lepidoptera: Nepticuloidea)

Opostegidae
Monotrysia genera
Taxa named by Philipp Christoph Zeller